Receptacle may refer to:

Biology
 Receptacle (botany), a plant anatomical part
 Seminal receptacle, a sperm storage site in some insects

Electrical engineering
 Automobile auxiliary power outlet, formerly known as cigarette lighter receptacle, a type of DC power outlet
 Duplex receptacle, a part of a NEMA connector (a type of mains electricity connection)
 Electric receptacle, a type of AC power outlet
 A "female connector" or a "jack" (see electrical connector)

Other uses
 Waste receptacle, a container for temporarily storing waste
 Cigarette receptacle, a container for extinguishing and disposal of cigarette waste
 Dumpster (receptacle), a type of mobile garbage bin
 Aerial receptacle, a container for sending and receiving packages with an unmanned aerial vehicle (UAV)

See also
 Container (disambiguation)
 Receiver (disambiguation)
 Enclosure (disambiguation)